Kra (Kʼ / ĸ) is a glyph formerly used to write the Kalaallisut language of Greenland and is now only found in Nunatsiavummiutut, a distinct Inuktitut dialect. It is visually similar to a Latin small capital letter K, a Greek letter Kappa: κ, or a Cyrillic small letter Ka: к.

For collation purposes, it is therefore considered to be a type of q, rather than a type of k, and should sort near q.

If this is unavailable, q is substituted. The letter can be capitalized as Kʼ, but it is not encoded separately as a single letter because it is very similar to the Latin capital letter K followed by an apostrophe, preferably the modifier letter apostrophe, .

In 1973, a spelling reform replaced kra in Greenlandic with the Latin small letter q (and its capital form, with the Latin capital letter Q'').

Notes

Greenlandic culture
Kra